Liu Lijuan (born 15 June 1984) is a Chinese female Paralympic sitting volleyball player. She is part of the China women's national sitting volleyball team.

She competed at the 2008 Summer Paralympics winning the gold medal.

See also 
 China at the 2008 Summer Paralympics

References 

Living people
Volleyball players at the 2008 Summer Paralympics
Paralympic competitors for China
Chinese women's volleyball players
1984 births
Chinese sitting volleyball players
Medalists at the 2008 Summer Paralympics
Paralympic medalists in volleyball
Paralympic gold medalists for China
21st-century Chinese women